The 2011 Erste Bank Open was a men's tennis tournament to be played on indoor hard courts. It is the 37th edition of the event known that year as the Erste Bank Open, and part of the ATP World Tour 250 Series of the 2011 ATP World Tour. It is held at the Wiener Stadthalle in Vienna, Austria, from 25 October through 30 October 2011. First-seeded Jo-Wilfried Tsonga won the singles title.

ATP entrants

Seeds

 Seeds are based on the rankings of October 17, 2011.

Other entrants
The following players received wildcards into the singles main draw:
  Martin Fischer
  Thomas Muster
  Dominic Thiem

The following players received entry from the qualifying draw:

  Aljaž Bedene
  Daniel Brands
  Steve Darcis
  Tommy Haas

Finals

Singles

 Jo-Wilfried Tsonga defeated  Juan Martín del Potro, 6–7(5–7), 6–3, 6–4
It was Tsonga's 2nd title of the year and 7th of his career.

Doubles

 Bob Bryan /  Mike Bryan defeated  Max Mirnyi /  Daniel Nestor, 7–6(12–10), 6–3

References

External links
 Official website
 ATP tournament profile